Tiago Alexandre Gonçalves da Conceição (born 17 April 1989 in Lisbon) is a Portuguese retired footballer who played as both a central defender and a left back.

References

External links

1989 births
Living people
Footballers from Lisbon
Portuguese footballers
Association football defenders
Liga Portugal 2 players
Segunda Divisão players
G.D. Estoril Praia players
Real S.C. players
Cypriot First Division players
Cypriot Second Division players
Doxa Katokopias FC players
Portuguese expatriate footballers
Expatriate footballers in Cyprus
Portuguese expatriate sportspeople in Cyprus